Uruguay Tourné del Campo (13 May 1929 – 30 November 2022) was a Uruguayan politician.

Background and early career
In his youth, Tourné was an activist for the National Party (Uruguay).

Tourné was an uncle to politician Daisy Tourné who served as Interior Minister.

Deputy and Senator
Tourné was repeatedly elected as Deputy for Montevideo for the years 1963 to 1977, although was obliged to step down prior to the completion of his mandate.

Tourné later served as a Senator from 1985 to 1989.

Later political activity
In later years he identified with the National Party (Uruguay)'s Herrerismo grouping. He was a supporter of Jorge Larrañaga.

Personal life and death
Tourné died on 30 November 2022, at the age of 93.

References

See also
 Politics of Uruguay
 List of political families#Uruguay

1929 births
2022 deaths
Members of the Chamber of Representatives of Uruguay
Members of the Senate of Uruguay
National Party (Uruguay) politicians
20th-century Uruguayan politicians
21st-century Uruguayan politicians